Masson Island or Mission Island is an ice-covered island about  long and rising to , lying  northwest of Henderson Island within the Shackleton Ice Shelf. Masson Island was discovered in February 1912 by the Australian Antarctic Expedition under Sir Douglas Mawson, who named it for Professor Sir David Orme Masson of Melbourne, a member of the Australian Antarctic Expedition Advisory Committee.

See also
 Composite Antarctic Gazetteer
 List of Antarctic and sub-Antarctic islands
 List of Antarctic islands south of 60° S 
 List of islands of Australia
 SCAR
 Territorial claims in Antarctica

References

External links

Islands of Queen Mary Land